The Westland Arena is a 1,483-seat multi-purpose arena in Yorkton, Saskatchewan. It is home to the Yorkton Terriers, a Junior "A" ice hockey team, as well as the Yorkton RawTec Maulers, a member of the SMAAAHL.

References

Indoor arenas in Saskatchewan
Indoor ice hockey venues in Canada
Sports venues in Saskatchewan
Sport in Yorkton